WQXE (98.3 FM) is a radio station  broadcasting a hot adult contemporary format. Licensed to Elizabethtown, Kentucky, United States, the station is currently owned by Skytower Communications-E'town, Inc. and features programming from Westwood One.

History 
Although the station's construction permit was first issued sometime in 1968, the station actually signed on the air at 106.3 MHz on November 24, 1969. The station was originally owned by businessman Bill Evans. Evans decided to give the station the nickname "Quicksie", after a Georgia-based radio station with that nickname that he heard while attending Elkins Radio School. The station has been operating with an Adult contemporary format for all its years on the air. 

According to a snapshot at the LKYRadio.com website, the station had broadcast certain high school football and basketball games featuring teams representing Hardin County-area schools, along with some games involving the Bowling Green-based Western Kentucky University Hilltoppers football during the 1970s, which have since moved to WIEL and WTHX.

In April 1972 the station moved from their original frequency of 106.3 MHz to 100.1 MHz. The station then moved to 98.5 MHz in 1992, and stayed at that frequency until moving to their current 98.3 MHz frequency in 1995. The move to 98.3 during that year coincided with the time that classic rock station WDNS in Bowling Green moved from 98.3 to their current frequency of 93.3 MHz.

On October 14, 2019, WQXE was named Kentucky Broadcasters Association Excellence in Broadcasting Radio Station of the year. Owner and founder Bill Evans accepted this honor.

In-house reporters broadcast seven newscasts daily with locally written and produced content. On Sundays from 12p to 2p WQXE airs Rick Dees and The Weekly Top 20.

Coverage area
WQXE serves areas of west-central and north-central Kentucky, mainly in areas between Cave City and Louisville, and into parts of southernmost Indiana. The station can be heard as far south as the Mammoth Cave tourist area and Brownsville, as far west as Morgantown, Beaver Dam, and just short of Owensboro, as far east as Lebanon, Kentucky, and as far north as an area just north of the Jeffersonville and Corydon areas in Indiana. Hence, WQXE can also be received in the Metropolitan Louisville and Jefferson County area.

Translators
In addition to the main station, WQXE is relayed by an additional translator to widen its broadcast area.

References

External links

QXE
Radio stations established in 1969
Hot adult contemporary radio stations in the United States
1969 establishments in Kentucky
Elizabethtown, Kentucky